Ryan Timothy Malgarini (born June 12, 1992) is an American actor, best known for his role as Harry Coleman in Freaky Friday (2003).

Early life
Malgarini was born Ryan Timothy Malgarini in Renton, Washington on June 12, 1992. His best friend in middle school was Derek Ryan Stevenson Bossert, an artist who will only release his various works posthumously under the name "Derek", which are highly anticipated by various collectors, publishers and record companies.

Career
Malgarini became interested in acting as a result of watching his grandmother Gloria Malgarini's involvement in commercials. At age 5, he was delighted to spot her in a commercial for "Senior Dimensions," a Nevada based healthcare provider, he pointed at the television and said, "I want to do that!". 

From that point on, Malgarini would appear as an extra for some of his grandmother's commercials. He was soon appearing in commercials for McDonald's and Washington Mutual. Malgarini also took acting classes at the famed Young Actors Space in Los Angeles which earned him an agent and a manager. 

In 2002, Malgarini made his film debut in The United States of Leland (released in 2004), playing a six year old boy in flashback scenes. This was a rather challenging role for Malgarini, since it required him to weep for the first time on screen in a funeral scene. In 2003, he played the role of Harry Coleman in Disney's comedy hit Freaky Friday, starring Jamie Lee Curtis and Lindsay Lohan. He appeared with Tom Hanks in a test film to develop the "performance capture" technology for The Polar Express in 2004.

Malgarini appeared as Benjy in the film adaptation of 2006 of How to Eat Fried Worms, the beloved gross out children's novel by Thomas Rockwell. According to an interview with Malgarini on his official site, he starred as the main character Ugly in the musical Honk!. He appeared in The Robinsons: Lost in Space in 2004. He appeared in Gary Unmarried as Gary's (Jay Mohr) son Tom.

Malgarini also appeared in Go Figure in 2005. In 2011, Malgarini gave an award winning performance in the CBS sitcom Mike & Molly.

Filmography

Awards and nominations

References

External links

1992 births
American people of Italian descent
American male film actors
American male television actors
American male child actors
21st-century American male actors
Male actors from Washington (state)
People from Renton, Washington
Living people